The Last of the Just is a post-war novel by André Schwarz-Bart originally published in French (as Le Dernier des justes) in 1959. It was published in an English translation by Stephen Becker in 1960. It was Schwarz-Bart's first book and won the Prix Goncourt, France's highest literary prize. The author was the son of a Polish Jewish family murdered by the Nazis and he based the story on the massacre in York.

The story follows the "Just Men" of the Levy family over eight centuries. Each Just Man is a Lamed Vav, one of the thirty-six righteous souls whose existence justifies the purpose of humankind to God.  Each "bear the world's pains... beginning with the execution of an ancestor in 12th-century York, England... culminat[ing] in the story of a schoolboy, Ernie, the last... executed at Auschwitz." It has been described as an enduring classic that reminds "how easily torn is the precious fabric of civilization, and how destructive are the consequences of dumb hatred-whether a society's henchmen are permitted to beat an Ernie Levy because he's Jewish, or because he's black or gay or Hispanic or homeless."

Gilbert Highet, a Book-of-the-Month Club judge called it, "the saddest novel I have ever read, almost as sad as history."

References

1959 French novels
French historical novels
Prix Goncourt winning works
1959 debut novels
Atheneum Books books